VR5 or variations thereof may refer to:

 VR.5, American science-fiction television series
 VR5 engine, a family of petroleum fuelled Internal combustion engines
 VRC-30 (formerly VR-5), a United States Navy Fleet Logistics Support squadron